Zou Peng (born September 30, 1982, in Dalian) is a former Chinese football player.

Club career
Zou Peng began his professional career at Dalian Shide in 2000. He scored his first professional goal in the 2002 season against Sichuan Dahe. He suffered tore ligament in 2003, and was excluded from main squad.

In 2005, he was loaned to Sichuan First City.

In 2006, he returned to Dalian Shide, but did not have much appearances. By the end of the season, he sought for transfer to Wuhan Optics Valley, but the trade was unsuccessful.

In 2007, he was loaned to Jiangsu Sainty.

In 2008, he left Dalian and transferred to Chengdu Blades.

In 2012, Zou joined Shenzhen Mingbo. The team was dissolved before the season was finished.

In 2013, he moved to Qinghai Senke.

In 2014, Zou returned to Dalian and joined Dalian Transcendence in the China League Two.

Managerial career
Zou retired after the 2014 season, and started to work as assistant coach for the team until 2018, when the team got dissolved.

In 2020, Zou Peng joined Dalian Pro as youth training coach.

Career statistics

Honours

Club
Dalian Shide
Chinese Jia-A League/Chinese Super League: 2000, 2001, 2002
Chinese FA Cup: 2001

References

External links
 
Player profile at Sina.com

1982 births
Living people
Chinese footballers
Footballers from Dalian
Dalian Shide F.C. players
Chinese Super League players
China League One players
China League Two players
Association football midfielders